Hellspawn are fictional supernatural warriors from Todd McFarlane's comic book series, Spawn. The main character in the series, Spawn, is himself a Hellspawn.

Description
The Hellspawn are under the command of Malebolgia, the ruler of the eighth realm of hell, and are mainly used as an officer corps for hell's army. They were created by Malebolgia and Mammon. Hellspawn are infused with dark energy matter, called Necroplasm, when they are created. This power is infinite while in Hell and finite when outside.

Most Hellspawns were once human, and made a bargain with Malebolgia to return to Earth for either love or vengeance; he would agree to return them to Earth in exchange for the promise of service in Satan's Hellspawn army. This deal usually backfires on the Hellspawn, as then Malebolgia would return them to Earth several years (or decades) into the future. The Hellspawn are bonded with a symbiotic armor that protects the Host. Their time on Earth is also limited. Each time a Hellspawn uses his powers it brings him closer to a second death, returning him to hell.

The nature of Hellspawn as generals in hell's army is threefold. Either the Spawn will be a successful murderer and will use his energy to kill innocent and evil alike, thereby providing hell with more souls, or he will try to do good by killing bad people. However, this will only supply hell with the souls of the worst kind of murderers (Kincaid, Wynn, etc.). Alternatively, some will refuse to kill and be destroyed by heaven, in which case hell does not lose anything and will just make another Hellspawn.

Eventually it is revealed that at least the last known Hellspawn are not creations of Malebolgia, but rather Mammon, trying to enact a breeding program between the most successful bloodlines represented by his Hellspawn. Al Simmons and Wanda, both related to famous Hellspawn of modern times, are the apex of such a process. However, later issues retcons this as Malebolgia and Violator were the true masterminds behind the hellspawns and their true origins are expanded in Spawn 291, 294, and 295 retcons this as Hellspawns were created by combining the powers of both Heaven and Hell by fusing a white demon and a black angel. Malebolgia was the one to discover them with Violator assisting him in the creation of Hellspawns since the first.

Notable Hellspawn
 Al Simmons As a human, he worked as a government assassin, until he had a change of heart. He was murdered by his partner, Chapel, and went straight to Hell. He made a deal with Malebolgia, who, unknown to Simmons, sent him five years into the future. Simmons discovers that his face still bears the wounds of his assassination and that his wife has married his best friend, who was able to give her something Simmons couldn't - a child. After refusing to use his powers to commit acts of terror on the world, Malebolgia sends another Demon, Violator, to force Simmons, now called Spawn, to use up his power that will ultimately return him to Hell.
 Sir John Of York Sir John was a knight from the mid-15th century, who fought during a civil war in the fictional country of Bahavia. He was released from service to Louis II of Bahavia after he and three others mistakenly killed the Archbishop of Bahavia, Sir Thomas Of Bahavia (they mistook some angry words by the King as an order). He was killed on a battlefield in Freedonia by the King's bodyguards as he approached King Louis for forgiveness. For his past deeds of killing (and enjoying it), John was sent to Hell, where he, like others, made a deal with Satan. He was returned to Earth, several years in the future and clad in medieval looking symbiotic armor. Upon realizing what had happened (which was helped along with him finding his own grave), John traveled throughout Bahavia, doing good deeds in the hope he would be redeemed. He teamed up with Witchblade (his old lover before he became a hellspawn), taking down an evil king. He was eventually slain by the demon hunter Angela. He is also known for fighting The Clown. As of spawn 303 John was resurrected.
 Cogliostro A former Hellspawn, he found a way to remove his armor, and thus ended the pact between him and his master. The reason Cogliostro is still alive is that he is stuck between Heaven and Hell. Heaven does not want him because he was once a servant of Hell. Hell does not want him because he betrayed them. At first, it seems that Cogliostro spends his time training any young Hellspawn who will listen to him, in the hope that they will turn from the dark path. Later on, it is revealed that Cogliostro is actually Cain, the biblical figure who killed his own brother out of envy. By that deed, he became the first man to go to hell, and the first to become a Hellspawn. He helps young Hellspawn to fight their demon masters, in the hope that one day he can claim the Throne of Hell. By the time he did he gave it up to other demons and returned to earth.
 Nyx is a young Wiccan who "borrows" Spawn's symbiote to rescue a friend from Hell. She first helps Spawn recover his symbiote after being betrayed by Cogliostro, and features prominently in recent comic's as Spawn's sidekick and is hinted to be his lover. In issue 182, she is captured by Al Simmons' detached symbiote and controlled by it. She however is not considered to be a true Hellspawn due to having a human body as opposed to a necroplasmic body.
 Mandarin A Hellspawn that appeared in China during the final years of the Song dynasty. His human name is Chenglei, and he suffered from elephantiasis, which left him heavily disfigured. When his village of Mhisi could not pay their tribute, Chenglei was given to the Governor instead. There he was used as entertainment, tortured and humiliated. Though Chenglei's condition may have limited physical harm to his body, he was killed when an arrow pierced a part of him that seemingly was free from the condition. Upon Chenglei's death bed, Mammon, acting as an emissary from Malebogia, came and promised him the fulfillment of his desires. Chenglei later on returned as a Hellspawn, where he killed off all the people in the Governor's palace except for one man, the palace storyteller, who had shown him kindness in his life. Chenglei was last seen by the storyteller riding alone, away from the slaughter. There were men, however, who swear that they saw the Hellspawn leading an army, with a beautiful concubine by his side, into Hell. There, legends state that he rules one of the circles of Hell with his concubine-Queen by his side.
 Morana Morana is the child of Wanda Blake and Al Simmons and is the final product of Mammon's manipulation, breeding into one offspring the best bloodlines for Hellspawn. Mammon considers her to be the one who will sit by his side and rule the world. When Al Simmons caused the miscarriage of their child, Wanda was brought by Al Simmons to the hospital. There under the guise of a doctor, Mammon stole the child. She was brought under the care of Vrykolakas, while Mammon raised her. She has appeared alongside Mammon as the cloaked figure several times during Armaggedon and only upon issue 182 is her true identity revealed. In issue #184, she is sealed away alongside Mammon by Nyx. Spawn Resurrection and onwards retcons her out with Simmons and Wanda having an unborn son now with said abuse towards wife was a false memory by demons to get him into suicide. Despite the retcon Morana would show up in the King Spawns series with a different backstory.
 Lord Covenant A 12th Century knight killed in a holy crusade far from his homeland, who returns to Earth as a Hellspawn. As a plague of violence and turmoil cover the English countryside, the Dark Knight must choose whether to align himself with the innocent inhabitants of the once-thriving kingdom or with the malevolent forces of evil and corruption. He is killed by the Phlebiac Brothers, but saw a vision of his lost love and rejoined her in the afterlife.
 Gunslinger Spawn A Hellspawn whose history is to be told in Spawn issues 174 and 175. Gunslinger's history is revealed through the journal of Al Simmon's great grandfather, Francis Charles Parker (would later rename himself as Henry Thomas Simmons). There it is revealed that Gunslinger Spawn's human name is Jeremy Winston, a preacher known in the town of Bane as "Ol' Job". Ed Kemper, a wealthy businessman in the town attempted to seize Winston's land which led to the deaths of Winston's family. Winston was then framed for the crime and hanged without a trial. Before his death, however, Winston was visited by Mammon, who offered to give him the power to seek vengeance on all the people of Bane, those who had wronged him and his family and all those who had stood by and did nothing but allow the injustice that was committed against them. To be sure of the decision, Mammon waited until Ol' Job/Winston was in the face of death to see if he would change his mind. But Job was resolute in his decision and was resurrected as a Hellspawn. Within 24 hours, he slaughtered every man, woman and child in the town of Bane except for Al Simmon's great grandfather whom Mammon told Winston to spare and whom Job himself thought was innocent. After this Jeremy Winston descended into hell. Gunslinger would show up in mordern day since issue 301 and his backstory changed into being man named Javier who lost his sister amy and later becomes a member of the Scorched.
 World War One Spawn He is a Hellspawn introduced in issue 179, titled "War Spawn". His human name is captain Thomas Coram and was an English soldier in the First World War. He is also the great grand father of Wanda Blake. Thomas Coram had a hidden relationship, which was considered forbidden at that time with Selma, an African. Their forbidden love was hidden from others for fear of being judged by the public, including Coram's own family, which continued even though Thomas Coram himself married and had another family. Thomas Coram's relationship with Selma led to the birth of Michael, who would be Wanda Blake's grandfather. Michael joined the First World War under Thomas Coram's command against his parents' wishes. Unable to stop Michael from joining the war, Thomas Coram promises Selma to protect Michael during the war. However, in the battle of Somme that occurred in France, Michael is mortally wounded. Coram, desperate to save his son's life makes a deal with Mammon to surrender his life and soul in exchange for his son's life. Mammon transfers Michael's wounds to him. And upon his death he becomes a Hellspawn, forced to lead an army of undead and endlessly battle in hell, in preparation for when he would become a commander of hell's legions in the war with heaven. His only source of relief was the knowledge that his son would lead a full life.
 Jim Downing He is a new Hellspawn after Al Simmons kills himself in Spawn Endgame issue 181. He wears the same suit as Simmons did in the initial comics. Unlike his predecessor, he has very little control over the symbiote's abilities and does not always recall what he does as Spawn.  His magic counter is also unique in that instead of decreasing from the use of necroplasm, it actually increases. Currently, it is unknown what this may entail.It's shown that he has angel powers but as of Spawn 250 and 292 Al Simmons returns to take back control of the symbiote leaving Downing a normal man once again.
 Claudius Darius He was a Hellspawn who became one of the greatest Hellspawns. In life he was a Roman soldier who had sexual intercourse with women and then killed mercilessly without any hope nor remorse. He was finally killed by woman with the help of the archangel, Radkiel, and was sent to Hell. After seven hundred years, in the seventh sphere of Hell, Claudius Darius became a Hellspawn of incredible power. He was so powerful that he managed to kill the archangel, Radkiel, with ease. Soon he began to walk the Earth for several hundred years more, until he'd became "friends" with Godfrey VI of Freedonia. After killing Sir John of York in the Battle of York of Freedonia, he was soon beheaded by Godfrey VI of Freedonia, because of his true origins.
 Necro Cop- An artificial hellspawn made by the government.
 Raven Spawn- One of Malebolgia's Hellknights.
 Ninja Spawn- A ninja from the toyline that debuted in the comics.
 Nordik- A Hellspawn from the Nordic times.
 Brian-  the godslayer.
 Raenius- A demi god who became a Hellspawn and the half brother of Zeus.
 Jessica Priest- The killer of Al Simmons as of 300 she had become the new she-spawn.
 Lord Nakadai: A Hellspawn from Feudal Japan.
 Skullsplitter: A new hellspawn that debuted in issue 301.
 Monolith: a hulking red hellspawn that debuts in 313.
 Omega Spawn: A hulking hellspawn that conquered worlds.
 Plague Spawn: A powerful hellspawn that debuted in 315.
 Nightmare Spawn- a powerful hellspawn who can make nightmares debuting in the king spawn series.
There are other Hellspawn such as Daniel Llanso from the Curse of the Spawn spinoff, as well as Ken Kurosawa, Mangler, Cheveyo, and Caleb from the Shadows of Spawn manga, though it is unknown if they are part of the main series' continuity.

In other media
Hellspawn appear in some of the Spawn video games, as well as in the movie and the animated series.
Some hellspawn appear as a cameo in Mortal Kombat 11.

References

External links
Spawn related comic spin-offs
Comic Book Resources-CBR News: A Hell of a Comic: David Hine Talks "Spawn"
Broken Frontier: Inside look: Spawn 175

Comics characters who use magic
Fictional demons and devils
Fictional soldiers
Fictional warrior races
Horror comics
Spawn characters
Spawn (comics)
Characters created by Todd McFarlane
Mythology in comics
Image Comics characters who are shapeshifters
Image Comics characters with accelerated healing
Image Comics characters with superhuman strength
Image Comics supervillains